A gnat may be one of a variety of small insects.

Gnat or GNAT may also refer to:
GNAT, a Free Software compiler for the Ada programming language
Grand National Assembly of Turkey
Gnat (surname)
Gnat Computers, an early microcomputer company
GNAT (torpedo), the Allied term for the German G7es homing torpedo  
Folland Gnat, a light jet fighter/trainer aircraft
GNAT-750, an unmanned aerial vehicle
"Gnat" (song), by Eminem from the 2020 album Music to Be Murdered By: Side B

See also
 
 Gnats (disambiguation)